Kjell Alrich Schumann (born 8 April 1966) is a Norwegian convicted of killing a police officer during the NOKAS robbery.

He confessed on September 27, 2006, that he killed police officer Arne Sigve Klungland, during the NOKAS robbery.

He was sentenced to 16 years' imprisonment ('forvaring'). He was released in 2014 after serving ten years in prison.

Schumann studied agriculture at vocational school level ('landbruksskole').

References

21st-century Norwegian criminals
Norwegian male criminals
Norwegian bank robbers
Norwegian people convicted of murder
People convicted of murder by Norway
Living people
1966 births